Roberto Aceves Villagrán (born 7 April 1962) is a Mexican wrestler. He competed in the 1984 Summer Olympics.

References

External links
 

1962 births
Living people
Wrestlers at the 1984 Summer Olympics
Mexican male sport wrestlers
Olympic wrestlers of Mexico